Rio Bravo (Spanish: Río Bravo, meaning "Fierce River") is an unincorporated community in Kern County, California.

A post office operated at Rio Bravo from 1912 to 1919.

References

Unincorporated communities in Kern County, California
Unincorporated communities in California